South Carolina Highway 108 (SC 108) was a state highway that existed in the east-central part of Chesterfield. It was partially in the city limits of the town of Cheraw.

Route description
SC 108 began at an intersection with SC 100 (now Teal's Mill Road) southeast of Cheraw. It traveled to the northeast into Cheraw, where it met its eastern terminus, an intersection with SC 9.

History
SC 108 was established in 1940. It was decommissioned in 1947. It was downgraded to a secondary road. Today, it is known as Main Street Extension and West Main Street.

Major intersections

See also

References

External links
Former SC 108 at the Virginia Highways South Carolina Annex

108
Transportation in Chesterfield County, South Carolina